is a Japanese politician of the New Komeito Party, a member of the House of Representatives in the Diet (national legislature). A native of Osaka, Osaka and graduate of Soka University, he was elected to the House of Representatives for the first time in 1993.

References

External links 
 Official website in Japanese.

1955 births
Living people
People from Osaka
Members of the House of Representatives (Japan)
New Komeito politicians
21st-century Japanese politicians